Tales from the Barrel House is the sixth solo music album by Seth Lakeman released on 18 November 2011.

Track listing
"More Than Money"
"Blacksmiths Prayer"
"The Watchmaker's Rhyme"
"Hard Road"
"The Sender"
"Salt From Our Veins"
"Brother Of Penryn"
"Apple Of His Eye"
"Higher Walls"
"The Artisan"

References

Seth Lakeman albums
2011 albums